Nikola Dinev Nikolov (18 October 1953 – 1 June 2019) was a Bulgarian super-heavyweight Greco-Roman and freestyle wrestler, and Sambist who won two world and five European GR titles between 1977 and 1986. He placed fifth at the super-heavyweight freestyle event of the 1976 Summer Olympics.

References

External links
Nikola Dinev profile at the United World Wrestling database

1953 births
2019 deaths
Olympic wrestlers of Bulgaria
Wrestlers at the 1976 Summer Olympics
Bulgarian male sport wrestlers
Bulgarian sambo practitioners
World Wrestling Championships medalists
People from Nova Zagora
European Wrestling Championships medalists